Dušan Domović Bоlut (born 23 October 1985), also credited as Dušan Bоlut, is a Serbian professional basketball player who is former world No. 1 ranked in men's individual 3x3 rankings by the International Basketball Federation (FIBA). He plays for Aliens and Serbia men's national 3x3 team. He is widely considered to be the greatest 3x3 basketball player of all time.

Early life
Domović Bolut was born and raised in Novi Sad, Serbia. His interest in basketball began at the age of nine. He soon began playing on courts around his neighborhood; back then, 3-on-3 basketball was essentially the only way the sport was played in the streets of the city.

3x3 career
Domović Bolut started to play at the FIBA 3X3 World Tour in August 2012. He plays for Serbian team Novi Sad.

BIG3 career
On May 3, 2019, Domović Bolut was selected with the 24th overall pick by the Ball Hogs in the 2019 BIG3 draft. On June 21, 2019, it was announced that Bolut had to withdraw from playing in BIG3 after being allegedly threatened by FIBA with not being able to play in the Olympics if he didn't leave the league.

On June 15, 2021, Bolut was selected with the 3rd overall pick by Power in the 2021 BIG3 draft.

He plays for team Aliens in the BIG3, 3-on-3 basketball league.

National team career 
Domović Bolut represents Serbia in 3x3 basketball. He won two gold medals at the FIBA 3x3 World Championships, 2012 in Greece and 2016 in China and silver medal at the 2014 tournament in Russia. At the 2017 FIBA 3x3 World Cup he won his 3rd gold medal for Serbia and was selected to the FIBA 3x3 World Cup 2017 Team of the Tournament.

Basketball career 
Domović Bolut played basketball for his hometown teams Meridiana and Vojvodina of the Basketball League of Serbia B (2nd tier). He also played for Kožuv in the Macedonian First League.

Awards and accomplishments 
 FIBA 3x3 World Tour winner: 3 (2014, 2015, 2018, 2019)

Individual 
 2x FIBA 3x3 World Cup MVP Award: 2016, 2018
 2x FIBA 3x3 World Tour MVP Award: 2015, 2018
 FIBA Europe 3x3 Championships MVP Award: 2018
 3x FIBA 3x3 World Cup Team of the tournament: 2016, 2017, 2018
 FIBA Europe 3x3 Championships Team of the tournament: 2018
 FIBA 3x3 World's #1 player award: 2015
 FIBA 3x3 World Tour Most Spectacular Player: 2016, 2017, 2018
 Serbian B League Top Scorer: 2015

References

External links
 
 
 
 
 
 
 

1985 births
Living people
3x3 basketball players at the 2020 Summer Olympics
Basketball players at the 2015 European Games
Basketball players from Novi Sad
Big3 players
European Games medalists in basketball
European Games bronze medalists for Serbia
European champions for Serbia
FIBA 3x3 World Tour players
KK Meridiana players
KK Vojvodina players
Medalists at the 2020 Summer Olympics
Olympic 3x3 basketball players of Serbia
Olympic bronze medalists for Serbia
Olympic medalists in 3x3 basketball
Point guards
Serbian expatriate basketball people in North Macedonia
Serbian expatriate basketball people in the United States
Serbian men's 3x3 basketball players
Serbian men's basketball players
OKK Konstantin players